Kliny is a rural locality (a village) in Golovinskoye Rural Settlement, Sudogodsky District, Vladimir Oblast, Russia. The population was 14 as of 2010.

Geography 
Kliny is located on the Kamenka River, 19 km west of Sudogda (the district's administrative centre) by road. Kashmanovo is the nearest rural locality.

References 

Rural localities in Sudogodsky District